Bird River (Lac du Bonnet) Airport  is a registered aerodrome located  northeast of Lac du Bonnet, Manitoba, Canada. Bird River Water Aerodrome is located at the mouth of the Bird River on Lac du Bonnet. The aerodrome is located on the south east side of Highway 315.

See also
Lac du Bonnet Airport
Lac du Bonnet (North) Water Aerodrome

References

External links
	Bird River (Lac du Bonnet) Airport on COPA's Places to Fly airport directory

Registered aerodromes in Manitoba

Transport in Eastman Region, Manitoba